Jan Bury (born 1 October 1963 in Przeworsk) is a Polish politician. He was elected to the Sejm on 25 September 2005, getting 12050 votes in 23 Rzeszów district as a candidate from Polish People's Party list.

He was also a member of Sejm 1991-1993, Sejm 1993-1997, and Sejm 2001-2005.

See also
Members of Polish Sejm 2005-2007

External links
Jan Bury - parliamentary page - includes declarations of interest, voting record, and transcripts of speeches.

1963 births
Living people
People from Przeworsk
United People's Party (Poland) politicians
Polish People's Party politicians
Members of the Polish Sejm 2005–2007
Members of the Polish Sejm 1991–1993
Members of the Polish Sejm 1993–1997
Members of the Polish Sejm 2001–2005
Members of the Polish Sejm 2007–2011
Members of the Polish Sejm 2011–2015
Maria Curie-Skłodowska University alumni